Talachyn or Tolochin is a city in Vitebsk Region, Belarus, and the administrative center of Talachyn District. The city has a record low temperature of -42.2C.

History
The town was first mentioned in 1433. The village was a shtetl: the Jewish population of the town constituted more than 70% of all inhabitants.
In March 1942 the Germans killed more than 2,000 Jews from the city and its suburbs in a mass execution.
A memorial has been erected to remember the fate of the victims.

Notable structures 
 Memorial to Jewish victims of World War II
 Church of St Anthony (Catholic)
 Church of the Holy Intercession (or: of the Protection of Our Lady)
 Pokrovsky Monastery
 Basilian Monastery, Talachyn
 Brothers' Cemetery (military cemetery)
 War Memorial

Notable citizens 
 Family home of Irving Berlin
 Jacob Rutstein

References

External links
 
 Photos on Radzima.org

Talachyn
Populated places in Vitebsk Region
Vitebsk Voivodeship
Orshansky Uyezd
Sennensky Uyezd
Shtetls
Jewish Belarusian history
Holocaust locations in Belarus